Plasmodium coggeshalli is a parasite of the genus Plasmodium subgenus Haemamoeba.

Like all Plasmodium species P. coggeshalli has both vertebrate and insect hosts. The vertebrate hosts for this parasite are birds.

Taxonomy 

The type specimen had been originally classified as Plasmodium lophurae but was described as a new species by Gres and Landau in 1997 based on morphology of the parasite and host cell.

References 

coggeshalli
Parasites of birds